Regulated Activation Networks(RANs), is a computational cognitive model. This modelling approach is based upon the Principles of Regulated Activation Networks(PRANs), which are summarized as:
 The model must have a dynamic topology.
 The model must be capable creating abstract concepts.
 The model must be able to learn association among the concepts.
 The model must exhibit time-variant activation states.

See also
 Connectionist models.
 Cognitive models.
 Computational Psychology.
 Neural Networks.
 Machine Learning.
 Deep Representations.
 Conceptual Spaces.
 Conceptual Representations.

References

Cognitive modeling